Socionics, in psychology and sociology, is a pseudoscientific theory of information processing and personality types. It incorporates Carl Jung's work on Psychological Types with Antoni Kępiński's theory of information metabolism. Socionics is modification of Jung's personality type theory that uses eight psychic functions instead of four. These cognitive functions are supposed to process information at varying levels of competency and interact with the corresponding function in other individuals, giving rise to predictable reactions and impressions—a theory of intertype relations. In contrast to the generally accepted views in personality psychology on age-related variability of the human psyche, socionics distinguishes 16 рsychophysiological types or types of informational metabolism unchanged throughout life. The issue of the existence of personality types is considered by modern personality psychology to be extremely controversial. However, the immutability of socionic  рsychophysiological types is determined by the stability of their neural structures in the brain. At the same time, psychological personality traits can evolve and change throughout life.
The special commission of the Russian Academy of Sciences (Commission on Pseudoscience) has placed socionics among such well-known pseudosciences as astrology and homeopathy.

Socionics was developed in the 1970s and 1980s, primarily by the Lithuanian researcher , an economist and dean of the Vilnius Pedagogical University's department of family science. The name "socionics" is derived from the word "society", because  believed that each socionic type of informational metabolism has a distinct purpose in society, which can be described and explained by socionics.

The central idea of socionics is that information is intuitively divisible into eight categories, called information aspects or information elements, which a person's psyche processes using eight psychological functions. Each sociotype has a different correspondence between functions and information elements, which results in different ways of perceiving, processing, and producing information. This in turn results in distinct thinking patterns, values, and responses to arguments, all of which are encompassed within socionic type. Socionics' theory of intertype relations is based on the interaction of these functions between types.

Independent authors point to the insufficient empirical validity of socionics both in its basis and in its further development, as well as the practical absence of studies on socionics outside the former USSR. In the West, the term 'socionics' is used in a different sense, to refer to an interdisciplinary area of research on distributed artificial intelligence systems and their applications to sociology.

Purpose 

Socionics provides a means of predicting the character of relations and degree of business compatibility, information sharing and psychological compatibility of people before their joining in one collective group, i.e. to solve the "inverse task" of sociometry.

According to Aleksandr Bukalov and Betty Lou Leaver, socionics uses Jungian typology, informational model of psyche, and theory of information metabolism for political and sociological analysis.

According to G. Fink and B. Mayrhofer, socionics is considered one of the four most popular models of personality (including cybernetic theory Maruyama, five-factor model, Big Five" and typology Myers–Briggs Type Indicator), deserving special attention because of its importance in the study of personality.

It was found that the nature and development of interpersonal relationships (both professional and personal) are far from random. Instead, they are based on how well suited each individual's psychological profiles are to one another, allowing  to develop 16 'socionic types' predicting and describing the interpersonal relationships between any combination of Jung's personality types.

According to R. Blutner and E. Hochnadel, "socionics is not so much a theory of personalities per se, but much more a theory of type relations providing an analysis of the relationships that arise as a consequence of the interaction of people with different personalities."

Philosopher L. Monastyrsky treats socionics as pre-science. At the same time, L. Monastyrsky himself proposes to pay attention to "the concept of socionic type".

Philosopher E. Pletuhina defines socionics as the study about the information interaction of the human psyche with the outside world, between people. She also defines it as the doctrine of psychological types of people and the relationships between them, as well as notes that the particular quality of socionics is that it considers the innate qualities of the human psyche, including the personality type, which cannot be arbitrarily changed without prejudice to the mental and physical health.

History

What resulted from their discussions and 's personal investigations was an information model of the psyche and of interpersonal interaction based on Jung's typology but with eight psychic functions rather than four. 's first works on socionics were published between 1978 and 1980.

Relation to the Myers–Briggs Type Indicator 
 

According to Betty Lou Leaver, Madeline Ehrman, and Boris Shekhtman, like the Myers–Briggs Type Indicator (MBTI), socionics is a sixteen-type derivative of Jung's work. Unlike MBTI, which is widely criticized for the lack of validity and utility, the socionics model strives to stay very close to the original descriptions and type labels suggested by Carl Jung. According to Betty Lou Leaver, "today's concepts of personality emanate most frequently from the work of Carl Jung, whose theories and research have blossomed into a juncture of philosophical and sociological inquiry. This field of inquiry has been called socionics."

According to Sergei Moshenkov and Tung Tang Wing, "MBTI and Socionics are contemporary sister sciences that categorize and describe human personality types in accordance to the predominance of certain mental faculties called psychic functions by Dr. Carl Jung."

A. Shmelev in his review of the book "MBTI: type definition" by I. Myers-Briggs and P. Myers notes the highest popularity of socionic books in Russian and remarks that their authors are appealing to the literary and artistic associations of the mass reader, in contradistinction to books on MBTI, which contain the empirical and statistical data on the types distribution in professional groups. S.A. Bogomaz considers the socionic typology as a version of post-Jung typology and believes that on a number of criteria it is more perspective than MBTI for the study of the differences between people, because it expands the volume of the typological features and offers an opportunity to form various typological groups with different motivations, attitudes, temperament, perception of information and thinking styles. It is also important the existence of preconditions to study intertype relations, that are substantially not developed within MBTI.

Socionics as an academic discipline 

Through the work of the International Institute of Socionics and other schools of socionics, there are four scientific peer-reviewed journals (on the practical application of the methods of socionics in management, consulting, psychology, pedagogy, education, psychotherapy, and humanities) and an annual International conference on socionics. The Institute gives "popularization and proliferation of socionic knowledge" as one of its goals. 

Svetlana V. Ivanova notes that socionics is taught in more than 150 universities in Russia, Ukraine and other CIS and European Union countries. Some universities in Russia (including Altai State Technical University, Bashkir State University,
Krasnoyarsk State Pedagogical University, 
and Saint Petersburg State University)
Ukraine, Bulgaria, and Romania, have published or commissioned a number of textbooks and monographs on socionics, or on psychology, pedagogy and management, which socionics and its methods are devoted to specific topics.

Areas of research include educational socionics, sociological socionics, aviation socionics, library socionics,  technical socionics, linguistic socionics, penitentiary socionics, and socionics in other subject areas.

Socionics is used in education, not only as a tool for teachers to manage the learning process, but also as a basis for the development and improvement of education and training. Bogdanova claim that a teacher holding socionic knowledge and technologies can consciously collaborate with others and improve professional efficiency. Targeted use of intertype relations helps intensify the didactic process, increase the motivation of students. Socionics is also used to assess the individual psychological and personal qualities to forecast the success of employee career.

Izmailova and Kiseleva found socionics interesting to be applied in advertising and marketing, because it allows you to explain the reasons for the behavior of consumers.

Socionics is a tool for the study of personality and creativity of the writer, the typology of the characters in his works. The method of linguistic-socionic modeling proposed by L. M. Komissarova, used for analysis of individual lexicon of language personality. A translation of socionic characteristics in verbal ones is called the "method of linguistic-socionic modeling" and widely used.

Socionic methods have been proposed for the modeling of information processes in the "human-machine" systems, and practically used to model systems "aircraft operator" in pilots' training, and other similar areas.

Due to the variety of applications of socionics, its concepts and information models, in the 1990s, Bukalov proposed to distinguish socionics of personality, or differential socionics, and generalized, more abstract integral socionics. Bukalov believes that the concept of information metabolism, cybernetic modeling and general systems theory extends beyond of psychology and sociology, and consider the relationship of technical information devices, and the types of information human interactions as operator with various technical and electronic management systems of major industries, including chemical, nuclear power stations, complex computer complexes with adaptive tunable to a specific operator interfaces.

Propagation of socionics

International Institute of Socionics lists a number of academic publications on socionics in English in peer-reviewed journals. Since 2000 socionics as a scientific discipline and a field of research has been recognized in Russia and Ukraine.

Pedagogical socionics 

The concepts and methods of socionics are widely used in pedagogy, this collaboration creates a new scientific branch – pedagogical socionics.

Pletuhina noted that the parent, trainer or teacher, who knows the theory of socionics, who also understands an idea of the "image of a socionics type" and who can determine the child's personality type with a sufficient degree of probability can use those opportunities of the individual approaches that socionics provides to raise and educate a child.

The role that socionics takes in the educational process is not limited to being a teacher's tool for the managing process. It is also a base for development and improving the educational system and for preparing staff. Teachers armed with socionics technology can consciously establish relationships with other people and increase efficiency of their pedagogical skills. Rational implementation of intertype relationships can push educational process to become more intensive and increase students' motivation.

Socionics is also researched practical methods and techniques dedicated to evaluation person's individual psychological values to prognoses professional success.  Keneva, Marchenko, and Minaev argue that socionics might become a theoretical base for personal-oriented educational technologies.

Socionics in astronautics 

In Yuri Gagarin Cosmonaut Training Center which located in Star City, Russia socionics methods are successfully used since 1992 for training Russian astronauts and international astronauts' crews and preparing them to spaceflights. Interpersonal issues and effective collaboration are extremely important in extreme conditions while working in a close space and are vital for successful spaceflight. In Star City conducted number of science seminars based on socionics methods and person typology to training space crews. Forming space crews by socionics methods was a central topic at the International conference on space researches, at the Space Forum 2011 and at the conference "Piloted flights into Space", also these issues were discussed in works of Doctor of medical science Professor Bohdashevsky, Doctor of philosophy Bukalov A.V. and Doctor of philosophy Karpenko O.B.

Aviation socionics 

According to order of the Ministry of transport of Russian Federation Flight Standards Department approved a default application "Training of pilots in the field of human factor", which expects basic socionics knowledge not only among pilots and other crew members, but also prognosing interaction in air crews by socionics methods.

To improve interaction among crew members, specialists of Saint Petersburg University examined 2330 people by socionics methods, including university students; aircrews of airlines; air traffic controllers; professors from almost all flight academies of Russia; delegates from Azerbaijan, Russia, Kazakhstan, Uzbekistan, Ukraine, and Estonia.

This database represents result of 10 years of scientific work. In their research, authors are relying on fundamental works of the Kyiv School of Socionics, International Institute of Socionics, publications in journals "Socionics, mentology and personal psychology", "Management and personnel: management psychology, socionics and sociology".

According to the experimental results were obtained socionics and sociometric data of air traffic controllers and correlation analyses of its parameters, also was determined the connection's intensity between person's interaction levels. The practical values of this research is to develop automated module to determine individual characteristic of operators and to evaluate the effectiveness of socionics in the management of air traffic,  particular in special cases of flight

Jung's psychological types

Carl Jung describes four psychological functions that are capable of becoming applicable psychically, but to differing degrees in individuals:

 Sensation – all perceptions by means of the sense organs
 Intuition – perception by way of the unconscious, or perception of unconscious events
 Thinking (in socionics, Logic) – judgement of information based on reason
 Feeling (in socionics, Ethics) – judgement of information based on sentiment

In addition to these four types, Jung defines a polarity between introverted and extraverted personalities. This distinction is based on how people invest energy: either into the inner, subjective, psychical world (usually called , soul, by Jung), or toward their outer, objective, physical world (including one's body).

By Jung's rules, 16 psychological types exist. But in his book "Psychological Types" he described in detail only 8, distinguished by the 8 possible dominant functions. Contrary to Socionics and MBTI, Jung did not conclude that the types had two introverted functions and two extroverted functions. He instead outlined that extroverted personality types had a Dominant extroverted function, with the remaining functions being of varying if lower levels of development that range from being Inferior introverted functions that are necessarily retarded to auxiliary functions that lie in the middle.

Information metabolism elements (often confused with memetics) 

In socionics, Jung's cognitive functions are always either introverted (focused on refining quality) or extroverted (focused on increasing quantity), and are referred to as information metabolism elements (IM Elements). These are said to process information aspects. To understand what an information aspect is, it is necessary to understand information metabolism as Augustinavičiūtė understood it.

 states that the human mind uses eight elements of information metabolism (mental functions)  to perceive the world, and each of these eight elements reflect one particular aspect of objective reality. In her works she describes aspects of the world based on physical quantities such as potential and kinetic energy, space, time, and their properties.

Often, other socionists have equated these information elements with their definition and according to fundamental physical concepts as well (Matter-Time-Energy-Space).). Matter is compared to Thinking, Energy to Feeling, Space to Sensing,  and Time to Intuition. Given the division of aspects of the absolute between Extroverted ("black") and Introverted ("white"), being four times two, their number is eight.

The 8 socionics symbols were introduced by  while working with Jung's typology and remain the dominant method of denoting the functions and the corresponding information aspects that they process. Text-based notation systems are also used, such as Victor Gulenko's 8 Latin letters ('P' for Pragmatism, 'E' for Emotions, 'F' for Force, 'I' for Ideas, 'L' for Laws, 'R' for Relation, 'S' for Senses, and 'T' for Time, respectively), or Myers-Briggs notation (Te, Fe, Se, Ne, Ti, Fi, Si, and Ni, respectively).

The 16 types
 usually used names like sensory-logical introvert (SLI) to refer to the types. In SLI the leading function is introverted sensation and the creative function is extraverted logic. She also introduced the practice of referring to types by the name of a famous person of the type (although types of these persons are not universally agreed upon, with the old name Napoleon for the SEE being replaced by Caesar after being deemed an inaccurate type assignment). For example, she called the SLI Gabin and the SEI Dumas. Also sometimes names such as Craftsman or Mediator are used to express the social role of the type—a convention introduced by socionist Viktor Gulenko in 1995. Given the formal similarities present between Socionics and the Myers–Briggs Type Indicator (MBTI) abbreviations frequently used in English, some prefer to distinguish socionic type names from Myers–Briggs' names by writing the last letter (J or P) in lower case (for example, ENTp, ESFj)—a practice introduced by Sergei Ganin. This is because the relationship between socionics and Myers–Briggs and Keirseyan types is controversial.

Dmitri Lytov and Marianna Lytova state that "main spheres of application of socionics are almost the same as for the Myers–Briggs Type Theory", and that observed differences in correlation "represent characteristic stereotypes of the socionics and the Keirsey typology. Others state that MBTI and socionics "correlate in roughly 30% of cases," and that "there are many subtle differences". J and P in Socionics and Myers–Briggs are completely different: in Myers–Briggs, J and P stands for the first extraverted function (J—extraverted thinking or feeling, P—extraverted sensing or intuition); in Socionics, J and P stands for the first function (J—rational (thinking and feeling), P—irrational (sensing and intuition)). This formal conversion is carried out in accordance with the Myers–Briggs Type Indicator.

In dividing the socion according to the four Jungian dichotomies, from this is formed 16 socionic types. The following tables provide a list of types with the names most commonly used in socionics:

The second concept is the functional dimensions. It was introduced by Aleksandr Bukalov. He defined the first dimension as the personal experience (Ex), the second dimension as social norms (Nr), the third dimension as the current situation (St), and the fourth dimension as the globality, or time perspective (Tm). This concept is useful because it best illustrates the difference in cognitive power (imagine measuring capability of 2D v. 3D measuring tool) and roughly describes abilities of each function to process and generate information. Still, definitions of dimensions require further research and clarification. For example, the vulnerable function tends to lose knowledge which have not been used.

Criticism 

Psychophysiologist Sergey Bogomaz says there is no reason for considering socionics as a separate science. He considers socionic typology to be a Russian version of post-Jung typology, similar to the Myers-Briggs typology, but distinguished by a greater number of typological features and the formulation of prerequisites for the study of intertype relationships.

Philosopher L. M. Monastirsky identified the use of speculative categories as the first shortcoming of socionics. Secondly, he stated that it lacks clearly defined typing method and each socionics school defines methods of their own. At the same time Monastirsky, recognizing the potential of socionics, proposed to turn to the concept of a socionic type for carrying out some research in the field of the methodology of science.

An important issue in the field of socionics is the problem of convergence between type diagnoses of different analysts. Vladimir Ermak showed that ignorance of model A of the type of information metabolism leads to numerous mistakes in the definition of a socionic type. In the early 2000s, socionic analysts tried to develop more rigorous approaches to type diagnosis.

See also

 Analytical psychology
 Japhetic theory
 Jungian Type Index
 Lysenkoism
 Philosophical realism
 Information metabolism

References

External links
 Media
 

 Video
  — biologist A. Panchin is  member of special Commission of Russian Academy of Sciences to Combat Pseudoscience.

 
Analytical psychology
Personality typologies
Pseudoscience